Gh0st RAT is a Trojan horse for the Windows platform that the operators of GhostNet used to hack into many sensitive computer networks. It is a cyber spying computer program. The "Rat" part of the name refers to the software's ability to operate as a "Remote Administration Tool".

The GhostNet system disseminates malware to selected recipients via computer code attached to stolen emails and addresses, thereby expanding the network by allowing more computers to be infected. According to the Infowar Monitor (IWM), "GhostNet" infection causes computers to download a Trojan known as "Gh0st RAT" that allows attackers to gain complete, real-time control. Such a computer can be controlled or inspected by its hackers, and the software even has the ability to turn on the camera and audio-recording functions of an infected computer that has such capabilities, enabling monitors to see and hear what goes on in a room.

See also 

 Computer surveillance
 Computer insecurity
 Cyber-security regulation
 Cyber-warfare
 Proactive Cyber Defence
 Surveillance
 Espionage
 Phishing

References

External links 
 Information Warfare Monitor - Tracking Cyberpower (University of Toronto, Canada/Munk Centre)

Trojan horses
Spyware
Web security exploits
Social engineering (computer security)
Public-domain software with source code